Lemyra hyalina is a moth of the family Erebidae. It was described by Cheng-Lai Fang in 1990. It is found in China in Guangxi and Guangdong.

Subspecies
Lemyra hyalina hyalina (China: Guangxi)
Lemyra hyalina nanlingica Dubatolov, Kishida & Wang, 2008 (China: Guangdong)

References

 

hyalina
Moths described in 1990